Hammer of the Gods is the first studio album by the American indie rock band Bottomless Pit, released in 2007 through Comedy Minus One Records. The album was recorded with Greg Norman at Studio Greg Studios II and Electrical Audio. The album was mixed at Electrical Audio. It was mastered at Abbey Road.

Track listing
"The Cardinal Movements" – 4:21
"Dogtag" – 3:30
"Repossession" – 3:13
"Leave the Light On" – 5:48
"Dead Man's Blues" – 4:21
"Human Out of Me" – 5:23
"Greenery" – 3:50
"Sevens Sing" – 6:56

References

2007 debut albums
Bottomless Pit (band) albums